Industrial ecology (IE) is the study of material and energy flows through industrial systems.  The global industrial economy can be modelled as a network of industrial processes that extract resources from the Earth and transform those resources into products and services which can be bought and sold to meet the needs of humanity.  Industrial ecology seeks to quantify the material flows and document the industrial processes that make modern society function.  Industrial ecologists are often concerned with the impacts that industrial activities have on the environment, with use of the planet's supply of natural resources, and with problems of waste disposal.  Industrial ecology is a young but growing multidisciplinary field of research which combines aspects of engineering, economics, sociology, toxicology and the natural sciences.

Industrial ecology has been defined as a "systems-based, multidisciplinary discourse that seeks to understand emergent behavior of complex integrated human/natural systems". The field approaches issues of sustainability by examining problems from multiple perspectives, usually involving aspects of sociology, the environment, economy and technology.  The name comes from the idea that the analogy of natural systems should be used as an aid in understanding how to design sustainable industrial systems.

Overview 

Industrial ecology is concerned with the shifting of industrial process from linear (open loop) systems, in which resource and capital investments move through the system to become waste, to a closed loop system where wastes can become inputs for new processes.

Much of the research focuses on the following areas:
 material and energy flow studies ("industrial metabolism")
 dematerialization and decarbonization
 technological change and the environment
 life-cycle planning, design and assessment
 design for the environment ("eco-design")
  extended producer responsibility ("product stewardship")
  eco-industrial parks ("industrial symbiosis") 
 product-oriented environmental policy
 eco-efficiency

Industrial ecology seeks to understand the way in which industrial systems (for example a factory, an ecoregion, or national or global economy) interact with the biosphere.  Natural ecosystems provide a metaphor for understanding how different parts of industrial systems interact with one another, in an "ecosystem" based on resources and infrastructural capital rather than on natural capital. It seeks to exploit the idea that natural systems do not have waste in them to inspire sustainable design.

Along with more general energy conservation and material conservation goals, and redefining related international trade markets and product stewardship relations strictly as a service economy, industrial ecology is one of the four objectives of Natural Capitalism.  This strategy discourages forms of amoral purchasing arising from ignorance of what goes on at a distance and implies a political economy that values natural capital highly and relies on more instructional capital to design and maintain each unique industrial ecology.

History

Industrial ecology was popularized in 1989 in a Scientific American article by Robert Frosch and Nicholas E. Gallopoulos.  Frosch and Gallopoulos' vision was "why would not our industrial system behave like an ecosystem, where the wastes of a species may be resource to another species? Why would not the outputs of an industry be the inputs of another, thus reducing use of raw materials, pollution, and saving on waste treatment?" A notable example resides in a Danish industrial park in the city of Kalundborg.  Here several linkages of byproducts and waste heat can be found between numerous entities such as a large power plant, an oil refinery, a pharmaceutical plant, a plasterboard factory, an enzyme manufacturer, a waste company and the city itself. Another example is the Rantasalmi EIP in Rantasalmi, Finland. While this country has had previous organically formed EIP's, the park at Rantasalmi is Finland's first planned EIP.

The scientific field Industrial Ecology has grown quickly in recent years. The Journal of Industrial Ecology (since 1997), the International Society for Industrial Ecology (since 2001), and the journal Progress in Industrial Ecology (since 2004) give Industrial Ecology a strong and dynamic position in the international scientific community.  Industrial Ecology principles are also emerging in various policy realms such as the concept of the Circular Economy that is being promoted in China. Although the definition of the Circular Economy has yet to be formalized, generally the focus is on strategies such as creating a circular flow of materials, and cascading energy flows. An example of this would be using waste heat from one process to run another process that requires a lower temperature. The hope is that strategies such as this will create a more efficient economy with fewer pollutants and other unwanted by-products.

Principles 
One of the central principles of Industrial Ecology is the view that societal and technological systems are bounded within the biosphere, and do not exist outside it.  Ecology is used as a metaphor due to the observation that natural systems reuse materials and have a largely closed loop cycling of nutrients.  Industrial Ecology approaches problems with the hypothesis that by using similar principles as natural systems, industrial systems can be improved to reduce their impact on the natural environment as well. The table shows the general metaphor.

IE examines societal issues and their relationship with both technical systems and the environment. Through this holistic view , IE recognizes that solving problems must involve understanding the connections that exist between these systems, various aspects cannot be viewed in isolation. Often changes in one part of the overall system can propagate and cause changes in another part. Thus, you can only understand a problem if you look at its parts in relation to the whole. Based on this framework, IE looks at environmental issues with a systems thinking approach. A good IE example with these societal impacts can be found at the Blue Lagoon in Iceland. The Lagoon uses super-heated water from a local geothermal power plant to fill mineral-rich basins that have become recreational healing centers. In this sense the industrial process of energy production uses its wastewater to provide a crucial resource for the dependent recreational industry.

Take a city for instance. A city can be divided into commercial areas, residential areas, offices, services, infrastructures, and so forth. These are all sub-systems of the 'big city' system. Problems can emerge in one sub-system, but the solution has to be global. Let's say the price of housing is rising dramatically because there is too high a demand for housing. One solution would be to build new houses, but this will lead to more people living in the city, leading to the need for more infrastructure like roads, schools, more supermarkets, etc. This system is a simplified interpretation of reality whose behaviors can be 'predicted'.

In many cases, the systems IE deals with are complex systems. Complexity makes it difficult to understand the behavior of the system and may lead to rebound effects. Due to unforeseen behavioral change of users or consumers, a measure taken to improve environmental performance does not lead to any improvement or may even worsen the situation.

Moreover, life cycle thinking is also a very important principle in industrial ecology. It implies that all environmental impacts caused by a product, system, or project during its life cycle are taken into account. In this context life cycle includes
Raw material extraction
Material processing
Manufacture
Use
Maintenance
Disposal
The transport necessary between these stages is also taken into account as well as, if relevant, extra stages such as reuse, remanufacture, and recycle.
Adopting a life cycle approach is essential to avoid shifting environmental impacts from one life cycle stage to another. This is commonly referred to as problem shifting. For instance, during the re-design of a product, one can choose to reduce its weight, thereby decreasing use of resources. It is possible that the lighter materials used in the new product will be more difficult to dispose of. The environmental impacts of the product gained during the extraction phase are shifted to the disposal phase. Overall environmental improvements are thus null.

A final important principle of IE is its integrated approach or multidisciplinarity. IE takes into account three different disciplines: social sciences (including economics), technical sciences and environmental sciences. The challenge is to merge them into a single approach.

Examples
The Kalundborg industrial park is located in Denmark. This industrial park is special because companies reuse each other's waste (which then becomes by-products). For example, the Energy E2 Asnæs Power Station produces gypsum as a by-product of the electricity generation process; this gypsum becomes a resource for the BPB Gyproc A/S which produces plasterboards. This is one example of a system inspired by the biosphere-technosphere metaphor: in ecosystems, the waste from one organism is used as inputs to other organisms; in industrial systems, waste from a company is used as a resource by others.

Apart from the direct benefit of incorporating waste into the loop, the use of an eco-industrial park can be a means of making renewable energy generating plants, like Solar PV, more economical and environmentally friendly. In essence, this assists the growth of the renewable energy industry and the environmental benefits that come with replacing fossil-fuels.

Additional examples of industrial ecology include:
Substituting the fly ash byproduct of coal burning practices for cement in concrete production
Using second generation biofuels. An example of this is converting grease or cooking oil to biodiesels to fuel vehicles.
South Africa's National Cleaner Production Center (NCPC) was created in order to make the region's industries more efficient in terms of materials. Results of the use of sustainable methods will include lowered energy costs and improved waste management. The program assesses existing companies to implement change.
Onsite non-potable water reuse
Biodegradable plastic created from polymerized chicken feathers, which are 90% keratin and account for over 6 million tons of waste in the EU and US annually. As agricultural waste, the chicken feathers are recycled into disposable plastic products which are then easily biodegraded into soil. 
Toyota Motor Company channels a portion of the greenhouse gases emitted back into their system as recovered thermal energy.
Anheuser-Busch signed a memorandum of understanding with biochemical company Blue Marble to use brewing wastes as the basis for its "green" products.
Enhanced oil recovery at Petra Nova.
Reusing cork from wine bottles for use in shoe soles, flooring tiles, building insulation, automotive gaskets, craft materials, and soil conditioner.
Darling Quarter Commonwealth Bank Place North building in Sydney, Australia recycles and reuses its wastewater.
Plant based plastic packaging that is 100% recyclable and environmentally friendly.
Food waste can be used for compost, which can be used as a natural fertilizer for future food production. Additionally, food waste that has not been contaminated can be used to feed those experiencing food insecurity.
Hellisheiði geothermal power station uses ground water to produce electricity and hot water for the city of Reykjavik. Their carbon byproducts are then injected back into the Earth and calcified, leaving the station with a net zero carbon emission.

Tools

Future directions
The ecosystem metaphor popularized by Frosch and Gallopoulos has been a valuable creative tool for helping researchers look for novel solutions to difficult problems.  Recently, it has been pointed out that this metaphor is based largely on a model of classical ecology, and that advancements in understanding ecology based on complexity science have been made by researchers such as C. S. Holling, James J. Kay, and further advanced in terms of contemporary ecology by others. For industrial ecology, this may mean a shift from a more mechanistic view of systems, to one where sustainability is viewed as an emergent property of a complex system. To explore this further, several researchers are working with agent based modeling techniques
.

Exergy analysis is performed in the field of industrial ecology to use energy more efficiently. The term exergy was coined by Zoran Rant in 1956, but the concept was developed by J. Willard Gibbs. In recent decades, utilization of exergy has spread outside physics and engineering to the fields of industrial ecology, ecological economics, systems ecology, and energetics.

Other examples 

Another great example of industrial ecology both in practice and in potential is the Burnside Cleaner Production Centre in Burnside, Nova Scotia. They play a role in facilitating the 'greening' of over 1200 businesses that are located in Burnside, Eastern Canada's largest industrial park. The creation of waste exchange is a big part of what they work towards, which will promote strong industrial ecology relationships.

Onsan Industrial Park is a case-study program intended to serve as an example of policies and practices relevant to pursuing a green growth model of development. The potential benefits of the EIP model are being shown in the Republic of Korea, where more than 1,000 businesses from a wide range of industries call the Ulsan Mipo and Onsan Industrial Park in South Korea home. This park is South Korea's industrial capital because it has more than 100,000 jobs.

A common practice for water waste management systems is to use the left over "sludge" as fertilizer. The waste water contains lots of phosphorus and nitrogen which are valuable chemicals to use in fertilizer.

Gjenge makers ltd is another example of industrial ecology. The company takes discarded plastics and makes them into bricks. Gjenge makers receives the leftover plastic waste from packaging factories and recycling facilities and sells the pavers.

See also

References

Further reading

 The industrial green game: implications for environmental design and management, Deanna J Richards (Ed), National Academy Press, Washington DC, USA, 1997, 
 'Handbook of Input-Output Economics in Industrial Ecology', Sangwon Suh (Ed), Springer, 2009,

External links

Articles and books
Industrial Ecology: An Introduction
Industrial Ecology
Industrial Symbiosis Timeline
Journal of Industrial Ecology (Yale University on behalf of the School of Forestry and Environmental Studies).
Industrial Ecology research & articles from The Program for the Human Environment, The Rockefeller University

Education
Industrial Ecology open online course (IEooc)
Erasmus Mundus Master's Programme in Industrial Ecology
Industrial ecology programme at the NTNU: Industrial Ecology Programme at NTNU, Trondheim – Norway 
Industrial Ecology Master's Programme at Leiden University & TU Delft (Joint Degree), Leiden/Delft – The Netherlands
Center for Industrial Ecology at Yale University’s School of Forestry & Environmental Studies, New Haven – CT, USA

Research material
Inventory of free and open software tools for industrial ecology research

Network
International Society for Industrial Ecology – ISIE

 
Industrial engineering
Systems ecology
Environmental economics